Melanie Troxel is a drag racer who has raced in Top Fuel, Funny Car and Pro Modified. She is the only woman to have won races in both Top Fuel and Funny Car. She was named Individual Sportswoman of the Year 2006 by the Women's Sports Foundation after becoming the first drive to appear in five consecutive championship finals that year.

Career
Melanie Troxel became interested in drag racing while working on cars for her father's race team. She had a breakout year in 2006, when while racing in Top Fuel, she became the first driver to appear in five championship finals consecutively. She won two of those races for Don Schumacher Racing. She was named Individual Sportswoman of the Year 2006 by the Women's Sports Foundation. As a result of losing her sponsorship, she left Don Schumacher Racing and joined Morgan Lucas for the 2007 season where she won twice more.

In 2008, she moved from Top Fuel to Funny Car to join Mike Ashley's team, which was sold to Roger Burgess before the start of the season. Troxel failed to qualify for four of the first six races of the year, but won an event, becoming the second woman to do so after Ashley Force two races previously. Troxel was the first woman to win races in both Top Fuel and Funny Car. For the following season, she raced the Pro Modified class for R2B2, which was an exhibition category at the time. In 2010, she continued to race Pro Mods, but with a limited number of Funny Car races as well, with some events in different locations on the same weekends. During her time on Pro Mods, she set the NHRA run record of 5.772 seconds. She was recruited in 2015 to race an electric drag racer for Don Garlits.

Personal life
Troxel was married to fellow drag racer Tommy Johnson Jr. between 2003 and 2009.

References

Living people
Female dragster drivers
American female racing drivers
Year of birth missing (living people)